A magneto is a permanent magnet electrical generator.

Magneto may also refer to:

Fictional characters 
 Magneto (Marvel Comics), a comic book character in the Marvel Comics Universe
 Magneto (film series character), the X-Men film series adaptation
 Magneto (Amalgam Comics), based in part on the character Magneto from Marvel Comics
 Magneto (Atlas Comics), a different comic book character, created by Stan Lee before Atlas became Marvel
 Captain Lance Magneto, title character of the shareware adventure game Cap'n Magneto

Music 
 Magneto (band), a Mexican boy band of the 1980s and 1990s
 "Magneto" (song), the debut single of the British group Brigade
 "Magneto", a track on Skeleton Tree, by Nick Cave and the Bad Seeds
 "Magneto", a song on Solid Pleasure, the first Yello album

Other uses 
 Operation Magneto, a 1985 South African military operation
 Magneto, codename for Microsoft Windows Mobile 5.0
 Portuguese name of Magnetum, an ancient town and former bishopric, now Meinedo in Portugal and a Latin Catholic titular see, now Lousada
 Ignition magneto, self-contained ignition system for internal combustion engines

See also 
 Magento, an e-commerce software package